Melinda Murphy is currently an executive producer for Expat Living, a lifestyle magazine in Singapore and Hong Kong.

Career
Prior to joining Expat Living, Murphy was a correspondent for the CBS television news program The Early Show between 2002 and 2006.  Before that, she was a feature and traffic reporter for WPIX-TV in New York City (2000–2002).

Murphy began her on-camera journalism career as the morning live feature reporter at News 12 New Jersey (1996–2000).

Murphy also worked at WCBS-TV (New York) as a news writer and field producer (1996–1998). While there, she won her first National Academy of Television Arts & Sciences (Emmy Award).

Awards

As the last airborne reporter on September 11, 2001, Murphy reported on the collapse of both World Trade Center towers and was one of two New York City reporters nominated for an Emmy Award for September 11 breaking news coverage. In 2002, she received an Emmy Award for her September 11 anniversary piece.

While at the WPIX, Murphy also won an Emmy for Outstanding On-Camera Achievement for Feature Reporting, and a New York State Broadcasters Association award for Best Feature. She was also nominated for an Emmy for her on-camera series of reports on a row house fire. She was also awarded an Emmy for television writing while at WCBS.

Published works

In 2002, Murphy co-edited "Covering Catastrophe: Broadcast Journalists Report September 11"—a collection of accounts from broadcast journalists who covered the events of the day—with Allison Gilbert, Phil Hirschkorn, Mitchell Stephens and Robyn Walensky.

Murphy has also contributed chapters to three other books, "Broadcasting Through Crisis," "On Camera: How to Report, Anchor and Interview," and "Living in Singapore."

Personal

Born in December 1963.  Murphy grew up in Midland, Texas, graduating from Texas A&M University with a degree in journalism. She is married and has two children.

References

External links
 Biography at cbsnews.com
 melindamurphy.info

American reporters and correspondents
American television journalists
American women television journalists
Texas A&M University alumni
1963 births
Living people